Iowa Park High School is a public school in Iowa Park, Texas (USA). It is part of the Iowa Park Consolidated Independent School District and serves students in and around the Iowa Park area.  In 2011, the school was rated "Academically Acceptable" by the Texas Education Agency.

The district, which has Iowa Park High as its sole comprehensive high school, includes Iowa Park, most of Pleasant Valley, and a small portion of Wichita Falls.

Student demographics
As of the 2005–2006 school year, Iowa Park High had a total of 611 students (90.5% White, 6.2% Hispanic, 1.00% African American, 0.1% Asian/Pacific Islander, and 2.8% Native American). 22.3% of the students are considered economically disadvantaged.

Athletics
The Iowa Park Hawks compete in the following sports:

Cross Country, Volleyball, Football, Basketball, Powerlifting, Golf, Tennis, Track, Softball & Baseball.

State Titles
Football - 
1969(2A), 1970(2A)^
Boys Track - 
1960(1A)

^Was Co-Champion with Refugio High School.

References

External links

Schools in Wichita County, Texas
Public high schools in Texas